Defending champion Guillermo Vilas defeated John Sadri in the final, 7–6(7–4), 6–3, 6–2 to win the men's singles tennis title at the 1979 Australian Open.

Seeds
The seeded players are listed below. Guillermo Vilas is the champion; others show the round in which they were eliminated.

  Guillermo Vilas (champion)
  John Alexander (first round)
  Victor Amaya (semifinals)
  Hank Pfister (first round)
  Balázs Taróczy (first round)
  John Sadri (final)
  Tim Wilkison (first round)
  Peter Feigl (first round)
  Peter McNamara (third round)
  Kim Warwick (third round)
  Peter Rennert (quarterfinals)
  Geoff Masters (second round)
  Phil Dent (quarterfinals)
  Ross Case (first round)
  Rod Frawley (quarterfinals)
  Paul McNamee (third round)

Qualifying

Draw

Finals

Top half

Section 1

Section 2

Bottom half

Section 3

Section 4

External links
 Association of Tennis Professionals (ATP) – 1979 Australian Open Men's Singles draw
 1979 Australian Open – Men's draws and results at the International Tennis Federation

Mens singles
Australian Open (tennis) by year – Men's singles